Pyrulofusus is a genus of sea snails, marine gastropod mollusks in the family Buccinidae, the true whelks.

Species
Species within the genus Pyrulofusus include:

 Pyrulofusus deformis (Reeve, 1847)

References

External links

Buccinidae
Monotypic gastropod genera